Curtis Louis Jerrells Jr. (born February 5, 1987) is an American professional basketball player for Zamalek of the Egyptian Basketball Super League.

High school
Jerrells was a four-year starter at Del Valle High School in his hometown, Austin, Texas.

College career
Jerrells played college basketball at Baylor University. He was the first player in Bears history to lead the team in scoring and assists all four seasons. He became the second player in BU history with 1,000 points, 400 assists and 100 steals.

As a freshman, Jerrells started every game and led the team in scoring, assists, steals and minutes played. In his sophomore season, Jerrells again started every game and led the team in scoring, assists and minutes. He was named 2007 All-Big 12 honorable mention by league's coaches and media and was chosen to 2007 Big 12 Championship All-Tournament team.

As a junior, Jerrells was a consensus first team All-Big 12 selection. He again led the team in scoring, assists and minutes. In his last season of the college basketball, Jerrells was named to the 2009 NIT All-Tournament Team was a Lowe's Senior CLASS Award finalist and a 2009 All-Big 12 third team selection by the league's coaches. He again led the team in points, assists and minutes.

College career statistics

Professional career
In September 2009, Jerrells signed for the San Antonio Spurs to their training camp roster. While he didn't make the team, the Spurs saw his potential and offered him a spot playing for their NBA Development League team, the Austin Toros. Jerrells was signed by the San Antonio Spurs on March 24, 2010, but immediately reassigned to their affiliate Austin Toros.

Jerrells played for the Spurs again in the NBA Summer League in 2010. His play during the 2010–11 preseason caught the eye of the New Orleans Hornets general manager Dell Demps, who previously worked as a scout and executive for the Spurs.

On October 18, 2010, Jerrells was traded to the New Orleans Hornets for a second round pick. However, he was waived just one week later at the end of training camp.

On November 27, 2010, he moved to Europe and signed a contract until the end of the 2010–11 season with the Serbian team Partizan Belgrade.

In June 2011, he signed a two-year contract with Fenerbahçe Ülker.

In March 2012, he signed a loan contract with the Spanish club Murcia for the rest of the season. After playing only for one week for the new club (two games), he broke his foot and missed the whole season.

On August 29, 2012, he signed a one-year contract with Beşiktaş.

In March 2013, Jerrells was signed by the Sioux Falls SkyForce and subsequently traded to the Maine Red Claws for center Chris Ayer.

In August 2013, Jerrells was signed by Olimpia Milano of the Italian Lega Basket Serie A.

On July 7, 2014, he signed a two-year deal with the Russian club UNICS Kazan.

On January 25, 2016, he signed with the Turkish club Galatasaray. On May 2, 2016, he parted ways with Galatasaray.

On July 10, 2016, Jerrells signed a two-year deal with Israeli club Hapoel Jerusalem. He helped Hapoel to win the Israeli League and Cup titles, as well as reaching the EuroCup semifinals. On July 8, 2017, Jerrells signed a two-year contract extension with Hapoel Jerusalem. On October 20, 2017, he was released by Hapoel, due to his conflict with coach Fotis Katsikaris.

On November 6, 2017, he returned to Olimpia Milano and signed a two-year deal. On July 1, 2019, Milano and Jerrells parted ways once more.

On August 1, 2019, he has signed with Dinamo Sassari of the Italian Lega Basket Serie A (LBA).  On March 3 he was replaced by Jaime Smith, the Sassari head coach, Gianmarco Pozzecco, explained that it was his decision based on technical choices.

On January 6, 2021, he signed in Poland for Anwil Włocławek.

At the end of the 2020–21 season he was hired back in Italy by Reyer Venezia for the 2021 LBA Playoffs. On August 16, 2021, Jerrells signed with Zamalek of the Egyptian Basketball Super League.

Career statistics

Domestic Leagues 

|-
| style="text-align:left;" | 2009–10
| style="text-align:left;" |  Austin Toros
| style="text-align:left;" | NBA D League
| 50 || 40.3 || 46.9% || 37.6% || 77.7% || 4.5 || 5.7 || 1.9 || 0.2 || 20.7
|-style="background:#AFE6BA;"
| style="text-align:left; background:#f8f9fa;" rowspan=2 | 2010–11
| style="text-align:left; background:#f8f9fa;" rowspan=2 |  KK Partizan
| style="text-align:left;" | Basketball League of Serbia
| 19 || 26.5 || 46.7% || 38.7% || 75.6% || 2.3 || 4.1 || 1.9 || 0.1 || 12.1
|-style="background:#AFE6BA;"
| style="text-align:left;" | ABA League
| 19 || 24.9 || 46.3% || 34.6% || 83.0% || 3.3 || 2.2 || 1.9 || 0.9 || 12.4
|-
| style="text-align:left;" rowspan=2 | 2011–12
| style="text-align:left;" |  Fenerbahçe Ülker
| style="text-align:left;" | Turkish Basketball League
| 17 || 18.5 || 37.5% || 26.1% || 60.0% || 1.6 || 2.0 || 1.1 || 0.3 || 6.4
|-
| style="text-align:left;" |  UCAM Murcia
| style="text-align:left;" | Liga ACB
| 2 || 21.0 || 45.5% || 50.0% || 100% || 1.5 || 0.5 || 1.0 || 0.0 || 7.5
|-
| style="text-align:left;" rowspan=2 | 2012–13
| style="text-align:left;" |  Beşiktaş
| style="text-align:left;" | Turkish Basketball League
| 17 || 27.6 || 42.9% || 42.9% || 85.7% || 2.6 || 3.0 || 1.1 || 0.1 || 12.1
|-
| style="text-align:left;" |  Maine Red Claws
| style="text-align:left;" | NBA D League
| 10 || 37.5 || 46.3% || 43.6% || 66.7% || 3.3 || 5.6 || 1.9 || 0.2 || 14.4
|-style="background:#AFE6BA;"
| style="text-align:left; background:#f8f9fa;" | 2013–14
| style="text-align:left; background:#f8f9fa;" |  EA7 Emporio Armani Milano
| style="text-align:left;" | Serie A
| 46 || 22.9 || 42.7% || 38.8% || 69.1% || 2.0 || 1.8 || 0.9 || 0.1 || 8.5
|-
| style="text-align:left;" | 2014–15
| style="text-align:left;" |  UNICS Kazan
| style="text-align:left;" | VTB United League
| 29 || 27.6 || 41.0% || 37.9% || 61.9% || 2.9 || 4.0 || 1.0 || 0.1 || 9.8
|-
| style="text-align:left;" | 2015–16
| style="text-align:left;" |  Galatasaray Odeabank
| style="text-align:left;" | Basketball Super League
| 4 || 14.3 || 45.0% || 50.0% || - || 0.5 || 2.0 || 0.0 || 0.0 || 4.8
|-style="background:#AFE6BA;"
| style="text-align:left; background:#f8f9fa;" | 2016–17
| style="text-align:left; background:#f8f9fa;" |  Hapoel Jerusalem
| style="text-align:left;" | Israeli Basketball Premier League
| 32 || 30.9 || 39.4% || 32.9% || 79.8% || 2.7 || 3.3 || 1.3 || 0.1 || 12.9
|-
| style="text-align:left;" rowspan=2 | 2017-18
| style="text-align:left;" |  Hapoel Jerusalem
| style="text-align:left;" | Israeli Basketball Premier League
| 2 || 31.0 || 35.7% || 30.0% || 40.0% || 2.0 || 3.5 || 1.5 || 0.0 || 7.5
|-style="background:#AFE6BA;"
| style="text-align:left; background:#f8f9fa;" |  EA7 Emporio Armani Milano
| style="text-align:left;" | Serie A
| 35 || 23.0 || 41.7% || 36.9% || 72.1% || 1.9 || 3.0 || 0.7 || 0.0 || 9.9
|-
| style="text-align:left;" | 2018–19
| style="text-align:left;" |  AX Armani Exchange Milano
| style="text-align:left;" | Serie A
| 27 || 22.9 || 45.2% || 37.5% || 83.7% || 2.3 || 2.0 || 0.7 || 0.1 || 10.4
|-
| style="text-align:left;" | 2018–19
| style="text-align:left;" |  Banco di Sardegna Sassari
| style="text-align:left;" | Serie A
| 20 || 21.6 || 36.1% || 33.3% || 69.4% || 2.0 || 2.3 || 0.7 || 0.1 || 8.7

European Competitions 

|-
| style="text-align:left;"| 2010–11 Euroleague
| style="text-align:left;"|  Partizan mt:s Belgrade
| 10 || 3 || 26.3 || 32.0% || 13.2% || 83.3% || 3.2 || 3.8 || 1.3 || 0.1 || 9.7 || 10.3
|-
| style="text-align:left;"| 2011–12 Euroleague
| style="text-align:left;"|  Fenerbahçe Ulker
| 14 || 3 || 21.0 || 41.8% || 28.6% || 84.8% || 1.9 || 1.7 || 0.7 || 0.3 || 8.6 || 9.0
|-
| style="text-align:left;"| 2012–13 Euroleague
| style="text-align:left;"|  Beşiktaş JK Istanbul
| 17 || 17 || 30.9 || 44.7% || 38.5% || 83.3% || 2.6 || 2.9 || 1.1 || 0.1 || 14.2 || 14.1
|-
| style="text-align:left;"| 2013–14 Euroleague
| style="text-align:left;"|  EA7 Emporio Armani Milan
| 28 || 12 || 24.1 || 44.0% || 42.1% || 66.7% || 2.3 || 2.5 || 0.7 || 0.0 || 11.3 || 10.2
|-
| style="text-align:left;"| 2014–15 Euroleague
| style="text-align:left;" rowspan=2|  UNICS
| 10 || 3 || 25.0 || 44.1% || 34.0% || 72.7% || 2.6 || 2.9 || 0.5 || 0.2 || 10.6 || 9.1
|-
| style="text-align:left;"| 2014–15 Eurocup
| 12 || 2 || 27.8 || 41.6% || 28.8% || 87.5% || 2.3 || 0.9 || 0.9 || 0.1 || 10.0 || 8.8
|-style="background:#AFE6BA;"
| style="text-align:left;"| 2015–16 Eurocup
| style="text-align:left;"|  Galatasaray Odeabank Istanbul
| 11 || 0 || 12.7 || 39.0% || 34.6% || 75.0% || 1.7 || 0.7 || 0.3 || 0.1 || 4.0 || 3.4
|-
| style="text-align:left;"| 2016–17 Eurocup
| style="text-align:left;"|  Hapoel Bank Yahav Jerusalem
| 19 || 19 || 34.4 || 48.5% || 44.0% || 78.3% || 3.0 || 3.7 || 1.3 || 0.1 || 16.8 || 16.6
|-
| style="text-align:left;"| 2017–18 Eurocup
| style="text-align:left;"|  Hapoel Bank Yahav Jerusalem
| 2 || 2 || 32.6 || 46.1% || 46.7% || 100% || 4.0 || 4.0 || 2.0 || 0.0 || 16.5 || 18.5
|-
| style="text-align:left;"| 2017–18 EuroLeague
| style="text-align:left;"|  AX Armani Exchange Olimpia Milan
| 24 || 2 || 20.6 || 44.5% || 36.8% || 80.0% || 1.8 || 2.7 || 0.5 || 0.0 || 9.5 || 9.3
|-
| style="text-align:left;"| 2018–19 EuroLeague
| style="text-align:left;"|  AX Armani Exchange Olimpia Milan
| 30 || 0 || 15.0 || 38.7% || 34.3% || 75.0% || 1.0 || 1.5 || 0.4 || 0.0 || 6.2 || 4.2
|-
| style="text-align:left;"| 2019–20 Basketball Champions League
| style="text-align:left;"|  Dinamo Sassari
| 14 || 0 || 21.7 || 36.7% || 38.7% || 72.2% || 2.1 || 1.9 || 1.1 || 0.0 || 9.3 || 7.4

References

External links
 Curtis Jerrells at baylorbears.com
 Curtis Jerrells at euroleague.net
 Curtis Jerrells at legabasket.it
 Curtis Jerrells at tblstat.net

1987 births
Living people
American expatriate basketball people in Israel
American expatriate basketball people in Italy
American expatriate basketball people in Poland
American expatriate basketball people in Russia
American expatriate basketball people in Serbia
American expatriate basketball people in Spain
American expatriate basketball people in Turkey
American men's basketball players
Austin Toros players
Basketball players from Austin, Texas
Baylor Bears men's basketball players
BC UNICS players
Beşiktaş men's basketball players
CB Murcia players
Dinamo Sassari players
Fenerbahçe men's basketball players
Galatasaray S.K. (men's basketball) players
Hapoel Jerusalem B.C. players
KK Partizan players
KK Włocławek players
Lega Basket Serie A players
Liga ACB players
Maine Red Claws players
Olimpia Milano players
Point guards